Bean Station is a town in Grainger and Hawkins counties in the state of Tennessee, United States. As of the 2020 census, the population was 2,967.

Established in 1776 as a frontier outpost by William Bean, it is considered one of the earliest permanently settled communities in Tennessee. It would grow throughout the rest of the 18th century and the 19th century as an important stopover for early pioneers and settlers in the Appalachia region due to its strategic location on the crossroads of Daniel Boone's Wilderness Road and the Great Indian Warpath.

During the American Civil War, the town would be the site of the final battle of the Knoxville campaign, before Confederate forces surrendered to a Union blockade in nearby Blaine. In the early 20th century, Bean Station would experience renewed growth with the development of the Tate Springs mineral springs resort, investment from U.S. Senator John K. Shields, and the Peavine Railroad, which provided passenger rail service connecting the town to Knoxville and Morristown.

In the 1940s, the town would be completely inundated by the Tennessee Valley Authority for Cherokee Dam with nearly all of its residents removed via eminent domain and federal court orders. Following its inundation, it would shift to the new junction of U.S. Route 11W and U.S. Route 25E, becoming a popular lakeside community, and a commuter town for the city of Morristown in neighboring Hamblen County.

It is part of the Kingsport Metropolitan Statistical Area, Knoxville Metropolitan Statistical Area, and Morristown Metropolitan Statistical Area.

History

Early years and settlement

In 1775, pioneers Daniel Boone and William Bean observed what is now Bean Station from the top of Clinch Mountain while on a hunting and surveying excursion. During the Revolutionary War, Bean would serve as a captain for the Virginia militia, and would be awarded over 3,000 acres in the German Creek valley where he surveyed and camped at previously with Boone in 1776. Bean would later construct a four-room cabin at this site, which served as his family's home, and as an inn for prospective settlers, fur traders, and longhunters. This inn and its area would have many names: Bean's Cabin, Bean's Crossroads, and Bean's Station, thus establishing the first reportedly permanent settled European-American community in present-day Tennessee. Following William Bean's death in May 1782, Bean Station would later grow into a frontier outpost established in the late 1780s by the sons of Bean. This outpost included the cabin that the Bean family resided in, a tavern, and a blacksmith's shop operated by Bean's sons. The settlement was situated at the intersection of the Wilderness Road, a north–south pathway constructed in the 1780s that roughly followed what is present-day U.S. Route 25E, and the Great Indian Warpath, an east–west pathway that roughly followed what is now U.S. Route 11W. This heavily trafficked crossroads location made Bean Station an important stopover for early American travelers, with taverns and inns were operating at the station by the early 1800s. By 1821, the pathway of the Wilderness Road from the Cumberland Gap to Bean Station would be established as the Bean Station Turnpike, and would receive state funding while it being a privately owned toll route due to its importance for early interstate travel in the Appalachia region.

Establishment as tourist center

Throughout the 1800s, Bean Station attracted the attention of numerous merchants and businessmen who appealed to the travelers that used the community's significant crossroads of the designated Wilderness Road and the East-West Road (Broadway of America) which replaced the Great Indian Warpath. In 1825, Bean Station Tavern, with a 40-room capacity, wine cellar, and ballroom, was constructed at the crossroads near the fort that Bean family would construct when the area was first settled in 1776. The tavern, was considered to be one of the largest of its time between New Orleans and Washington, D.C., and housed several famous guests including U.S. Presidents Andrew Jackson, Andrew Johnson, and James K. Polk.

The tavern, being popular with politicians while campaigning or traveling across the country, would provide heated encounters with political rivals who would stay at the tavern as well. One of the more notable incidents regarding such scenarios involved U.S. President Andrew Jackson, who arrived via stage coach with the intent to have lunch with the owner of the tavern. Upon his arrival, Jackson would see one of his political rivals on the front porch of the Bean Station Tavern. Jackson would cancel the lunch, and explain his regrets to the wife of the tavern's owner, stating, "It would be a shame for the President of the United States to get killed, or to kill somebody."

The main portion of the tavern would be destroyed from a major fire on Christmas night in 1886.

When the Tennessee Valley Authority announced the impounding of the Holston River and the site of Bean Station in the 1940s, efforts began to deconstruct and relocate the tavern to a new relocation site of the community. Following the cancellation of the Bean Station relocation project, the parts would remain in storage long-term at a warehouse located near the western intersection of US 25E and US 11W.

In 1961, the TVA proposed plans to create a 50-acre historical park near the western interchange of US 11W and US 25E with the tavern rebuilt on-site following efforts led by a Morristown historical group. However, these plans would be scrapped following the loss of the original tavern materials due to the deterioration from the lengthy storage period, rendering the plans infeasible.

The TVA-owned land reserved for the Bean Station Tavern park would be constructed into a public baseball park on behalf of Grainger County officials following the inability to construct the tavern.

Battle of Bean’s Station and the Civil War

During the Civil War, the Battle of Bean's Station took place in the westernmost area of the community on December 14, 1863. Confederate Army General, James Longstreet, attempted to capture Bean Station en route to Rogersville after failing to drive Union forces out of Knoxville. Bean Station was held by a contingent of Union soldiers under the command of General James M. Shackelford. After two days of gruesome fighting, Union forces were forced to retreat.

Tate Springs Resort

In the post-Civil War era, a businessman named Samuel Tate constructed a hotel west of Bean Station that became the main focus of a resort known as Tate Springs. Around the late 1870s, the property was purchased by Captain Thomas Tomlinson, a Union army veteran who served in the Battle of Bean's Station, would take up an interest in the Bean Station community, and transformed the property into a vast resort, focused on a large Victorian-style luxury hotel, that advertised the supposed healing powers of its mineral spring’s water. During its heyday, the resort complex included over three-dozen buildings, a  park, and an 18-hole golf course. The resort had attracted some of the wealthiest people in America during this time. The resort declined during the Great Depression and closed in 1941. In 1943, the hotel site would be redeveloped into a school and orphanage known as Kingswood. The main hotel structure was destroyed by fire in 1963, and the only remnants of the complex are the cabins of the site, the pool bathhouse, and the springhouse, the last of which was listed on the National Register of Historic Places in 1973. The Tate Springs site still runs as the Kingswood orphanage as of 2021.

Peavine Railroad and redevelopment efforts

From the late 19th century until the early 20th century, Bean Station was a stop along the Knoxville and Bristol Railroad, commonly known by locals as the Peavine Railroad. The railroad was a branch line of the Southern Railway that ran from Morristown to Corryton, a bedroom community outside of Knoxville. The Peavine Railroad had first operated between Morristown and Bean Station, with construction complete in 1893. The completion of the railroad would influence the formation of the Bean Station Improvement Company (BSIC), a redevelopment company, led by resident and former U.S. Senator John K. Shields, with the intent to bring life back to the community. The BSIC would lay the groundworks of a town street grid system, sell property for development, and pitch the community in widely distributed advertisements and brochures regarding the past, present, and future of Bean Station. The company would help fund and propose plans to further the town as an important multimodal distribution rail-and-road center, such as an extension of the Peavine Railroad across Clinch Mountain to the Cumberland Gap, and northeast to Bristol. The extension plans to both the Cumberland Gap and Bristol would not come to fruition, but rail access would be extended west through Grainger County to Knoxville. The Tate Springs resort located in (then) eastern Bean Station, had its peak popularity between the 1890s and 1920s when the Peavine Railroad provided passenger rail connections to the site.

The Peavine Railroad would end service in 1928, and the lines would be either demolished or washed out following the inundation of the Holston River by the Tennessee Valley Authority in 1942.

TVA and community displacement

The construction project of Cherokee Dam by the Tennessee Valley Authority (TVA) several miles downstream along the Holston River had plans that included impounding the site where the town was originally settled. Because of its historical significance, size, and potential relocation problems presented with Bean Station, officials from the TVA, Tennessee state government, historians, and concerned community members gathered in public forums to discuss the future of the town, and its relocation efforts in 1941 before the valley would be flooded the following year.

A commission consisting of state planning and TVA personnel would host town hall meetings during the spring of 1941 in Bean Station to review and developed plans for sites for Bean Station to relocate to as a planned village, similar to the planning process for the 'model town' of Norris for TVA's earlier Norris Project in the 1930s. After controversy arose following failed negotiations from unwilling property owners for the relocation sites, and reluctance from most Bean Stationers to relocate in a community effort, the community relocation project would be abandoned, with most citizens relocating on their own will.

Of the estimated 200 families who lived at the original site of Bean Station, nearly 150 or 87.5% were mandated to move via eminent domain. Many houses, 20 businesses, and Clinchdale, the estate of Senator John K. Shields, were demolished or moved, and at least one historical structure had to be relocated. In the project report established by the TVA following the Cherokee Project's completion, the agency would cite the opposition from residents in the Bean Station region as the biggest hurdle during the entire project, stating, "This stability of tenure and reluctance to move complicated the problem of relocation and removal. This area included the town of Bean Station, and the Noeton-Crosby area in Grainger County."

Community resistance and resilience, incorporation, and present day

Following the inundation of the original site of Bean Station in 1942 and the failed plans by the TVA and state officials relocating to new site, Bean Station would unofficially shift to the relocated intersection of US 25E and US 11W near the Grainger-Hawkins border. Through the mid-20th century, Bean Station continued to see positive growth in population and economic progress as the community's principal transportation routes, U.S. Routes 11W and 25E were used prominently for the nationwide trucking industry, making the community a site of truck stops and motels.

By the 1950s, Bean Station would be at the highlight of controversy regarding the then proposed Interstate 81 corridor of the Interstate Highway System planning to follow the US 11W route through Bean Station from Bristol to Knoxville, with a exit in the community providing access to Morristown and the Cumberland Gap via US 25E. Farmers in the community and surrounding area would oppose the project. Facing the opposition and swooning by neighboring Greene and Hamblen county officials, engineers would have I-81 redirected south of the community and the 11W corridor.

As the region's economy began to diversify, manufacturing soon took over agriculture as the area's main source of income. As the community witnessed increased development along routes 25E and 11W and the emergence of manufacturing facilities by the mid-century, the community would attempt to incorporate into a city in 1964. Residents would reject to incorporate in a 153 to 94 vote.

In 1967, community residents organized and chartered the Bean Station Volunteer Fire Department. Eight years later, the Bean Station Volunteer Rescue Squad would be established to service the community.

On May 13, 1972, 14 people were killed and 15 injured in a head-on collision between a double-decker Greyhound bus and a tractor-trailer on U.S. Route 11W in Bean Station. The accident is considered one of the deadliest and worst traffic collisions in the history of the state of Tennessee. The collision, the deadliest in state history, led to outcry from politicians and citizens in Bean Station calling for traffic safety and infrastructure improvements, such as the widening of 11W and other state highways, and the completion of Interstate 81 in Tennessee in order to alleviate the congestion that 11W experienced being the main thoroughfare between Knoxville and Bristol.

Following the completion of Interstate 81 in neighboring Morristown in December 1974, the community would witness a massive decline in business following the decreased traffic on 11W. Most truck stops, gift stores, and motels would close in Bean Station following the reported 60% decline in business in the community.

In 1977, residents in Bean Station would petition to incorporate into a city again, with new boundaries including portions of the neighboring Mooresburg community across the Hawkins County line. The proposal would be rejected in a 291 to 160 vote.

US 25E would experience an opposite scenario to 11W in Bean Station, as the completion of I-81 led to increased congestion on US 25E from its junction with I-75 in Kentucky through Bean Station into Morristown, due to the route becoming a popular alternate corridor for truckers bypassing I-75 in Knoxville. Urban sprawl-influenced residential development in Bean Station would also lead to the two-lane 25E to be overloaded with commuters to neighboring Morristown. In the 1980s, US-25E would be widened to a four-lane limited-access highway from Lakeshore Drive to across Cherokee Lake into Morristown, and from the gap at Clinch Mountain to the base near the westernmost junction of 11W and 25E in Bean Station. In 1995, US-11W and US-25E were relocated and widened into a four-lane controlled-access highway, bypassing Bean Station's central business district and prompting several businesses to relocate onto the new bypass.

In the mid-1990s, rumors regarding portions of southern Bean Station being possibly annexed into neighboring Morristown spread throughout the community, leading residents to petition an incorporation election in 1994. In 1996, community members voted by referendum to incorporate Bean Station into a city with a population of 2,171 residents.

On May 23, 2013, Down Home Pharmacy, a pharmacy located in downtown Bean Station, would be the site of an armed hostage and robbery. The act would be committed by an ex-police officer for the town, who would kill two in an execution-style shooting, and injure two others after robbing the pharmacy for opioids. The following day, a vigil at the Bean Station town hall would be held for the four victims with an estimated attendance of 300 individuals.

Geography

Bean Station is located in rural easternmost Grainger County, 45 miles northeast of Knoxville, where it borders the unincorporated community of Mooresburg at the line between Grainger and Hawkins counties. The town is situated in the Richland Valley (also known as Mooresburg Valley) with Clinch Mountain to the north and Cherokee Lake to the south. In the western of portion of Bean Station adjacent to Kingswood Home for Children on the Tate Springs resort site, two major highways merge, with U.S. Route 25E entering from the northwest, and U.S. Route 11W entering from the southwest. From this point, US-25E leads over Clinch Mountain  to Tazewell in Claiborne County, while US-11W runs west through the Richland Valley  to Rutledge, the seat of Grainger County. The highways split again just south of Bean Station's central business district, with 11W bypassing the business district and continuing northeastward  to Rogersville, and 25E continuing southward across Cherokee Lake into Hamblen County,  to Morristown.

Tennessee State Route 375 (also known as Lakeshore Drive) also intersects US-25E south of the business district, which traverses into several of Bean Station’s affluent outskirt lakefront neighborhoods and subdivisions.

The town limits include Wyatt Village, located next to an arm of Cherokee Lake along US-25E south of downtown, and portions of Tate Springs located near US-11W and Briar Fork Creek on Cherokee Lake. The town limits stretch  along the heavily trafficked US-25E to the Olen R. Marshall Memorial Bridge across Cherokee Lake, and  along US-11W to Bean Station Elementary School.

Since 2014, portions of unincorporated Hawkins County in the Mooresburg area have been annexed into the town limits.

Neighborhoods

 Bayside
 Campbell Heights
 Clinchview Landing
 Country Club Hills
 Crosby Park
 Gammon Springs
 Hillview Acres
 Lakeview Estates
 Leon Rock
 Livingston Heights
 Meadow Branch
 Meadow Creek Estates
 Shields Crossing
 Tanglewood
 Tate Springs
 Wyatt Village

Demographics

2020 census

As of the 2020 United States census, there were 2,967 people, 1,144 households, and 774 families residing in the city.

2010 census
As of the 2010 United States Census, there were 3,092 people, 1,149 households, and 827 families residing in the town.

96.8% were White, 0.6% Black or African American, 0.5% Native American, 0.1% Asian and 0.7% of two or more races. 2.3% were Hispanic or Latino (of any race).

The average household size was 2.46 and the average family size was 2.88.  25% of households had children under the age of 18 living with them, 51.8% were married couples living together, 6.3% had a male householder with no wife present, and 13.9% were female householders with no husband present.  28% of households were non-families. The median age of residents in the town was 47.8.  21.7% of residents were under the age of 18, and 16.2% were age 65 years or older.

Economy
In its retail and commercial markets, Bean Station has a small selection of restaurants and stores. A large cluster of run-down firework stores are located throughout the town due to Grainger County being among the few counties in Tennessee allowing the sale of fireworks. A family-operated IGA Market is the only grocery store in Bean Station area.

Bean Station is home to a furniture manufacturing facility, a Clayton Homes manufacturing facility, and a construction materials supplier.

In 2010, 72% of the town’s population was reported to commute outside of Grainger County for work, with most finding employment in Morristown. The average commute time for Bean Station residents is 24 minutes.

Arts and culture 

Since 1996, the town hosts an annual harvest festival in its downtown district celebrating the area's agricultural and craftsmanship. Thousands of guests attend. In 2007,  a Guinness World Record for the largest pot of beans was established at the 11th Harvest Pride festival, with the pot holding  of baked beans.

Historic sites 
 Battle of Bean's Station site
 Original Bean Station settlement site, Bean cabin site, and historical marker
 Tate Springs resort site and Tate Springs Springhouse

Parks and recreation
The town is popular with boaters and anglers due to its access to Cherokee Lake. A public golf course is also located within the town limits.
 
Parks and public recreation areas include:
 Bean Station Town Park, Harris Court Park, and public access to Cherokee Lake via a fishing pier and boat launches.

Government 
Bean Station uses the mayor-aldermen system, which was established in 1996 when the town was incorporated. It is governed locally by a five-member Board of Mayor and Aldermen. The citizens elect the mayor and four aldermen to four-year terms. The board elects a vice mayor from among the four aldermen.

Bean Station is represented in the 35th District of the Tennessee House of Representatives by Jerry Sexton, a Republican.

It is represented in the 8th District of the Tennessee Senate by Frank Niceley, also a Republican.

Bean Station is represented in the United States House of Representatives by Republican Tim Burchett of the 2nd congressional district.

Education
Bean Station Elementary School, located at the westernmost part of the town, is operated by the Grainger County Department of Education. Elementary students attend Bean Station Elementary, middle school students attend Rutledge Middle, and high school students attend Grainger High School in Rutledge, along with other students in the Grainger County Schools District, excluding the Washburn area.

Kingswood Home for Children, located in the Tate Springs area of Bean Station, operates as a children’s home.

Media

Newspaper
 Grainger Today, weekly news publication based in Bean Station reporting Grainger County related news; in operation since 2004.

FM radio
WJDT
WBGQ

Infrastructure

Utilities
Bean Station Utility District, (BSUD), a municipal utilities company, connects the town and portions of eastern Grainger County with municipal water services.

Appalachian Electric Cooperative (AEC), a utilities company based out of New Market in neighboring Jefferson County, provides electricity and the option for fiber broadband internet for all of Bean Station, portions of Hamblen County (including portions of Morristown), Jefferson County (including New Market, Baneberry, Jefferson City, Dandridge, and White Pine), and eastern Grainger County (including Rutledge). AEC, as of June 2018, provides services to 46,000 customers.

Sewer
Bean Station, as of 2021, does not have access to public sewer. Since the town's incorporation, officials have expressed interest, and have proposed several unsuccessful attempts towards constructing a sewage treatment system to stimulate economic development. In 2019, a master plan conducted by a Knoxville based engineering firm found that there was a definite need for public sewer service in Bean
Station, as most existing septic tank systems in the town have reported failures posing severe health hazards to residents, and development opportunities providing job and economic growth are limited with the lack of public sewer.

In January 2021, proposals for a sewer line extension by Morristown Utilities System into south Bean Station were approved by the town council. In May 2021, the project would be suspended temporarily following abandonment from businesses and lack of communication with Morristown Utilities from BSUD.

Transportation
All U.S. routes and state routes in Bean Station are maintained by the Tennessee Department of Transportation (TDOT) in TDOT Region 1, which consists of 24 counties in the East Tennessee region. Streets in the town are maintained by the Bean Station Street Department.

Principal highways
 /  (Lee Highway)
 /  (East Tennessee Crossing Byway, Appalachian Development Corridor S)
 (Lakeshore Drive)

Major surface routes
Several streets in the town are used to primarily connect residents to the principal highways, these streets include:
 Broadway Drive (old US 25E)
 County Line Road
 Crosby Drive
 Huntsman Lane
 Main Street (old US 11W)
 Meadow Branch Road
 Miller Road
 Moore's Chapel Road
 Phyllis Drive
 Rocky Springs Road
 Rocky Summit Road
 Shady Lane

Notable people
 Peter Ellis Bean - filibuster
 William Bean - longhunter, namesake, and town founder
 Robert E. Preston - Director of United States Mint

In popular culture
Bean Station was referenced on the NBC police procedural comedy series Brooklyn Nine-Nine, as one of the secondary characters on the show, Bill Hummertrout, cited it as his hometown.

The 1981 horror film, The Evil Dead, had filmed part of its opening scenes in northern Grainger County, and in Bean Station along Old U.S. Route 25E near Bean Station Elementary School.

References

Further reading
 Tennessee Valley Authority. Population readjustment studies of Bean Station community, Grainger County, Cherokee area 1940.
 Tennessee Valley Authority. The Bean Station Tavern restoration project 1944.
 Coffey, Ken. The Wilderness Road, The First Family of Tennessee: and Other Stories That Need to be Told 2013.
 Ball, Randy & Wolfe, Terry. Tate Springs 1898: Town of Bean Station, Tennessee 2013.

External links
Grainger County Chamber of Commerce

Towns in Tennessee
Towns in Grainger County, Tennessee
Morristown metropolitan area, Tennessee
Populated places established in 1996
1996 establishments in Tennessee
Knoxville metropolitan area
Towns in Hawkins County, Tennessee
Populated places inundated by the Tennessee Valley Authority